James Roe may refer to:

James Roe (American football) (born 1973), Arena Football League player
James Roe Jr. (Born 1998), Irish racing driver
James A. Roe (1896–1967), U.S. Representative from New York
James Elphinstone Roe (1818–1897), Australian convict, educator and journalist
James Roe (rower) (born 1988), British adaptive rower
James M. Roe (born 1943), amateur astronomer
Jimmy Roe (1908–1999), American soccer player
James Roe (MP), Member of Parliament for Cashel

See also
James Rowe (disambiguation)